Brigitte Wujak, née Künzel (born 6 March 1955 in Karl-Marx-Stadt) is a retired long jumper who represented East Germany with the SC Dynamo Berlin.

She won the silver medal at the 1980 Summer Olympics in Moscow with a personal best jump of 7.04 metres. This was the German record at the time, and remained her career best jump. The result places her fourth on the German all-time performers list, behind Heike Drechsler, Helga Radtke and Sabine Paetz.

She finished seventh at the 1982 European Championships, and retired after the 1984 season. She competed for the sports club SC Dynamo Berlin during her active career.

References

1955 births
Living people
East German female long jumpers
Athletes (track and field) at the 1980 Summer Olympics
Olympic athletes of East Germany
Olympic silver medalists for East Germany
Sportspeople from Chemnitz
Medalists at the 1980 Summer Olympics
Olympic silver medalists in athletics (track and field)